Luiz Fernando da Silva (born 2 July 1971) is a Brazilian athlete who specialises in the javelin throw. He won multiple medals on the regional level.

His personal best in the event is 79.50 metres, first set in 2000, then repeated in 2003.

Competition record

References

1971 births
Living people
Brazilian male javelin throwers
Athletes (track and field) at the 2003 Pan American Games
Pan American Games athletes for Brazil
21st-century Brazilian people